Dark Secret may refer to:

 Dark Secret (novel), a 2005 novel by Christine Feehan
 Dark Secret (horse) (1929–1934), American Thoroughbred racehorse
 Dark Secret (film), 1949 UK film based on play The Crime at Blossoms
 Dark Secret (novel), a 2016 novel by Edward M. Lerner